The 1888 Cork Senior Football Championship was the second staging of the Cork Senior Football Championship since its establishment by the Cork County Board in 1887.

Lees won the championship following a 0–03 to 0–01 defeat of Dromtarriffe in the final at Cork Park. This was their second title overall and their second title in succession.

Results

Final

Statistics

Miscellaneous

 Lees become the first team to win back to back titles.

References

Cork Senior Football Championship